Ojeong-gu was a district of the city of Bucheon in Gyeonggi-do, South Korea.

The district was abolished in July 2016 as Bucheon became a unified city without any administrative districts.

Administrative divisions 
Ojeong-gu was divided into the following "dong"s.
Gogang-dong
Gogang 1-dong
Gogangbon-dong
Sinheung-dong (Divided in turn into Samjeong-dong and Naedong)
Ojeong-dong (Divided in turn into Ojeong-dong and Daejang-dong)
Seonggok-dong (Divided in turn into Jakdong and Yeowol-dong)
Wonjong 1 and 2 Dong

See also 
Bucheon
Sosa-gu
Wonmi-gu

Economy 
Daewoo Bus Corporation has the business headquarters located here.

References

External links 
 Ojeong-gu Office 

Bucheon
Districts in Gyeonggi Province
2016 disestablishments in South Korea